The following elections occurred in the year 1823.

 1823 Norwegian parliamentary election
 1823 Papal conclave

See also
 :Category:1823 elections

1823
Elections